Quinn Gleason and Tereza Mihalíková were the defending champions, but both players chose not to participate.

Carmen and Ivana Corley won the title, defeating Katarina Kozarov and Veronica Miroshnichenko in the final, 6–2, 6–0.

Seeds

Draw

Draw

References

External Links
Main Draw

Henderson Tennis Open - Doubles